Blue Limbo is the ninth solo album by Susumu Hirasawa.

Background
The dystopian themes of the album were influenced by the Iraq War and the remaining traces of the Cambodian Civil War. One day before its release, "High-Minded Castle" and a new re-recording of "Love Song" from Aurora were given away for free to be used as a way to protest against the American response to the September 11 attacks and the compliance of the Japanese government to those actions.

Track listing

References

External links
 BLUE LIMBO

2003 albums
Susumu Hirasawa albums